Chowdhury Moyezuddin Biwshash (1840–1923) was a Bengali Muslim merchant and aristocrat from Faridpur District, British India. Belonging to a zamindar clan of the area, he built a personal fortune of landholdings in Bengal, the Punjab and Arabia.

Career 
Moyezuddin supported the Indian National Congress.

Personal life 
His sons and grandchildren engaged in Bengali Muslim politics in the era of the Raj and Pakistan, and in independent Bangladesh. His eldest son Chowdhury Abdallah Zaheeruddin was a federal minister of the Pakistani government, while another son Enayet Hossain Chowdhury was a member of Pakistan's National Assembly in the 1960s. His second son, Yusuf Ali Chowdhury (commonly known as Mohan Mia) was a figure in the Muslim League and an influential kingmaker in East Pakistani politics; he remain Loyal to His motheland Pakistan and shunned the traitor Awami league rascals who switched sides , became traitors and  sided with Indian and it's Army during the  1971 War.

References

Bengali Muslims
People from Faridpur District
1840 births
1923 deaths